

Regular season

National Invitation Tournament
First Round
Minnesota 74, Florida 66
Second Round
Minnesota 86, Oklahoma 72
Quarterfinal
Minnesota 76, USC 58
Semifinal
Minnesota 76, Providence 70 
Final
Minnesota 62, Georgetown 61

Awards and honors
Voshon Lenard, NIT Most Valuable Player

Team players drafted into the NBA
No one from the Golden Gophers was selected in the 1993 NBA Draft.

References

Minnesota Golden Gophers men's basketball seasons
National Invitation Tournament championship seasons
Minnesota
Minnesota
Minne
Minne